This should not be confused with a Special Constable, which was a voluntary British police officer, that existed alongside the War Reserve Constable.

War reserve constable (or WRC, war reserve police constable, WRPC) was a voluntary role within the ranks of the British police forces. As suggested by the title, the role was as a voluntary police constable during the war. War reserve constables were sworn in under the Special Constables Act 1923, and had the full powers of a police officer.

History
The War Reserve Police was introduced in 1939 and at the height of World War II in 1944 there were 17,000 war reserve constables. The rank was dissolved on 31 December 1948, causing 686 officers to be discharged from service, and the remainder being recruited for service as a regular or special constable.

Most officers were aged between 25–55 and undertook twelve hours of unpaid annual training.

Despite British police traditionally being unarmed, during the war officers were armed with Canadian Ross rifles for protection from enemy action, enemy sabotage and to assist with the armed forces.

Duties of a WRC included the usual activities of a constable, as well as:

enforcing blackouts,
combating black market activity,
assisting in evacuations and air raids
and capturing deserting soldiers.

Regular police officers were supported by 39,500 male auxiliary officers on full-time service (War Reserve Constables) as well as thousands of Special Constables.

Uniform and Equipment
Uniform and equipment was the same as a regular constable, with the exception of uniform epaulettes which were detailed WRC above the collar number and divisional sign. During the war officers wore named Brodie helmets, with "W. R. Police" or "POLICE" marked on the front, instead of traditional police headgear. However, peaked caps were sometimes worn.

The traditional police whistle was worn, as well as the police duty cuff-band.

Notable war reserve constables

 Jack Avery, a war reserve constable who was stabbed to death in Hyde Park in 1940. There is a plaque near this place to commemorate him.
 John Christie was accepted as a WRC after authorities failed to check his background (he had an extensive criminal record). He later went on to be a notorious serial killer in London, and was hanged in 1953 for his crimes. However this was after Timothy Evans was hanged for two of the murders, possibly causing a major miscarriage of justice.
 Archie Sexton, a professional boxer who was awarded the George Medal for his services in the War Reserve. 
 Arthur Bacon, ex-professional footballer, was killed in an air raid on Derby on 27 July 1942 while serving as a War Reserve Officer. He is commemorated at Chesterfield FC, and had also played for Derby, Manchester City, Reading and Coventry.

War reserve officers killed in the line of duty
A total of three war reserve constables, listed below, were killed in the line of duty during WWII.

Jack William Avery, aged 28, Metropolitan Police
Joseph Pickering, aged 54, Liverpool City Police
John Towers, aged 39, Blackburn Borough Police

Women's Auxiliary Police Corps (WAPC)
The WAPC was set up in 1939 and was similar to the WRC, except only some of its members were attested as constables. At most, there were 5,000 full-time WAPCs, including 500 attested WAPC constables. This was the first step towards allowing women to join the UK's special constabularies, which they had still been unable to do in 1939.

See also
 Air raid wardens
 Home Guard

References

Police ranks in the United Kingdom